Pinar del Río Airport  is an abandoned airport which formerly served Pinar del Río, the capital city of Pinar del Río Province in Cuba.

Facilities

See also
 La Coloma Airport

References

External links
 

Defunct airports
Airports in Cuba
Airport
Buildings and structures in Pinar del Río Province